There have been numerous attempts to decipher the rongorongo script of Easter Island since its discovery in the late nineteenth century. As with most undeciphered scripts, many of the proposals have been fanciful. Apart from a portion of one tablet which has been shown to deal with a lunar calendar, none of the texts are understood, and even the calendar cannot actually be read. The evidence is weak that rongorongo directly represents the Rapa Nui language – that is, that it is a true writing system – and oral accounts report that experts in one category of tablet were unable to read other tablets, suggesting either that rongorongo is not a unified system, or that it is proto-writing that requires the reader to already know the text. Assuming that rongorongo is writing, there are three serious obstacles to decipherment: the small number of remaining texts, comprising only 15,000 legible glyphs; the lack of context in which to interpret the texts, such as illustrations or parallel texts which can be read; and the fact that the modern Rapa Nui language is heavily mixed with Tahitian and is unlikely to closely reflect the language of the tablets—especially if they record a specialized register such as incantations—while the few remaining examples of the old language are heavily restricted in genre and may not correspond well to the tablets either.

Since a proposal by Butinov and Knorozov in the 1950s, the majority of philologists, linguists and cultural historians have taken the line that rongorongo was not true writing but proto-writing, that is, an ideographic- and rebus-based mnemonic device, such as the Dongba script of the Nakhi people, which would in all likelihood make it impossible to decipher. This skepticism is justified not only by the failure of the numerous attempts at decipherment, but by the extreme rarity of independent writing systems around the world. Of those who have attempted to decipher rongorongo as a true writing system, the vast majority have assumed it was logographic, a few that it was syllabic or mixed. Statistically, it appears to have been compatible with neither a pure logography nor a pure syllabary. The topic of the texts is unknown; various investigators have speculated they cover genealogy, navigation, astronomy, or agriculture. Oral history suggests that only a small elite were ever literate, and that the tablets were considered sacred.

Accounts from Easter Island

Jaussen 
In 1868 the Bishop of Tahiti, Florentin-Étienne Jaussen, received a gift from recent converts on Easter Island: a long cord of human hair wound around a discarded rongorongo tablet. He immediately recognized the importance of the tablet, and asked Father Hippolyte Roussel on Easter Island to collect more tablets and to find islanders capable of reading them. Roussel was able to acquire only a few additional tablets, and he could find no-one to read them, but the next year in Tahiti Jaussen found a laborer from Easter Island, Metoro Tauꞌa Ure, who was said to know the inscriptions "by heart".

Almost a century later, Thomas Barthel published some of Jaussen's notes. He compared Metoro's chants with parallel passages in other tablets and discovered that Metoro had read the lines of Keiti forwards on the reverse but backwards on the obverse. Jacques Guy found that Metoro had also read the lunar calendar in Mamari backwards, and failed to recognize the "very obvious" pictogram of the full moon within it, demonstrating a lack of any understanding of the contents of the tablets.

Thomson 
William J. Thomson, paymaster on the USS Mohican, spent twelve days on Easter Island from 19 December to 30 December 1886, during which time he made an impressive number of observations, including some which are of interest for the decipherment of the rongorongo.

Ancient calendar 

 Métraux criticizes Thomson for translating Anakena as August when in 1869 Roussel identified it as July, and Barthel restricts his work to Métraux and Englert, because they are in agreement while "Thomson's list is off by one month". However, Guy calculated the dates of the new moon for years 1885 to 1887 and showed that Thomson's list fit the phases of the moon for 1886. He concluded that the ancient Rapanui used a lunisolar calendar with kotuti as its embolismic month (its "leap month"), and that Thomson chanced to land on Easter Island in a year with a leap month.

Ure Vaꞌe Iko's recitations 
Thomson was told of an old man called Ure Vaꞌe Iko who "professes to have been under instructions in the art of hieroglyphic reading at the time of the Peruvian raids, and claims to understand most of the characters". He had been the steward of King Ngaꞌara, the last king said to have had knowledge of writing, and although he was not able to write himself, he knew many of the rongorongo chants and was able to read at least one memorized text. When Thomson plied him with gifts and money to read the two tablets he had purchased, Ure "declined most positively to ruin his chances for salvation by doing what his Christian instructors had forbidden" and finally fled. 

{| class="wikitable"
|+ 
! Recitation
! Corresponding tablet
|-
| Apai 
| E (Keiti)
|-
| Atua Matariri 
| R (Small Washington) ?
|-
| Eaha to ran ariiki Kete 
| S (Great Washington) ?
|-
| Ka ihi uiga 
| D (Échancrée)
|-
| Ate-a-renga-hokau iti poheraa 
| C (Mamari)
|}

 
The very title is a mixture of Rapanui and Tahitian: poheraꞌa is Tahitian for "death"; the Rapanui word is matenga. Ure was an unwilling informant: even with duress, Thomson was only able to gain his cooperation with "the cup that cheers" (that is, rum):

 The verses of Atua Matariri are of the form X ki ꞌai ki roto Y, ka pû te Z "X, by mounting into Y, let Z come forth", 
and when taken literally, they appear to be nonsense: 
"Moon, by mounting into Darkness, let Sun come forth" (verse 25),
"Killing, by mounting into Stingray, let Shark come forth" (verse 28),
"Stinging Fly, by mounting into Swarm, let Horsefly come forth" (verse 16).
These verses have generally been interpreted as creation chants, with various beings begetting additional beings. However, they do not conform to Rapanui or other Polynesian creation mythology. Guy notes that the phrasing is similar to the way compound Chinese characters are described. For example, the composition of the Chinese character 銅 tóng "copper" may be described as "add 同 tóng to 金 jīn to make 銅 tóng" (meaning "add Together to Metal to make Copper"), which is also nonsense when taken literally. He hypothesizes that the Atua Matariri chant which Ure had heard in his youth, although unconnected to the particular tablet for which he recited it, was a genuine rongorongo chant: A mnemonic which taught students how the glyphs were composed.

Fanciful decipherments 

In 1892 the Australian pediatrician Alan Carroll published a fanciful translation, based on the idea that the texts were written by an extinct "Long-Ear" population of Easter Island in a diverse mixture of Quechua and other languages of Peru and Mesoamerica. Perhaps due to the cost of casting special type for rongorongo, no method, analysis, or sound values of the individual glyphs were ever published. Carroll continued to publish short communications in Science of Man, the journal of the (Royal) Anthropological Society of Australasia until 1908. Carroll had himself founded the society, which is "nowadays seen as forming part of the 'lunatic fringe'."

In 1932 the Hungarian Vilmos Hevesy (Guillaume de Hevesy) published an article claiming a relationship between rongorongo and the Indus Valley script, based on superficial similarities of form. This was not a new idea, but was now presented to the French Academy of Inscriptions and Literature by the French Sinologist Paul Pelliot and picked up by the press. Due to the lack of an accessible rongorongo corpus for comparison, it was not apparent that several of the rongorongo glyphs illustrated in Hevesy's publications were spurious. 

At least a score of decipherments have been claimed since then, none of which have been accepted by other rongorongo epigraphers. 
For instance, ethnographer Irina Fedorova published purported translations of the two St Petersburg tablets and portions of four others. More rigorous than most attempts, she restricts each glyph to a single logographic reading. However, the results make little sense as texts. For example, tablet P begins (with each rongorongo ligature set off with a comma in the translation):

and continues in this vein to the end:

The other texts are similar. For example, the Mamari calendar makes no mention of time or the moon in Fedorova's account:

which even Fedorova characterized as "worthy of a maniac".

Moreover, the allographs detected by Pozdniakov are given different readings by Fedorova, so that, for example, otherwise parallel texts repeatedly substitute the purported verb  "take" for the purported noun  "a kind of yam". (Pozdniakov has demonstrated that these are graphic variants of the same glyph.) As it was, Fedorova's catalog consisted of only 130 glyphs; Pozdniakov's additional allography would have reduced that number and made her interpretation even more repetitive. Such extreme repetition is a problem with all attempts to read rongorongo as a logographic script.

Many recent scholars are of the opinion that, while many researchers have made modest incremental contributions to the understanding of rongorongo, notably Kudrjavtsev et al., Butinov and Knorozov, and Thomas Barthel, the attempts at actual decipherment, such as those of Fedorova here or of Fischer below, "are not accompanied by the least justification".

Harrison 

James Park Harrison, a council member of the Anthropological Institute of Great Britain and Ireland, noticed that lines Gr3–7 of the Small Santiago tablet featured a compound glyph,  (a sitting figure  holding a rod  with a line of chevrons (a garland?)  repeated 31 times, each time followed by one to half a dozen glyphs before its next occurrence. He believed that this broke the text into sections containing the names of chiefs.

Kudrjavtsev et al. 

Parallel texts: A short excerpt of tablets H, P, and Q

The group later noticed that tablet K was a close paraphrase of the recto of G. Kudrjavtsev wrote up their findings, which were published posthumously. Numerous other parallel, though shorter, sequences have since been identified through statistical analysis, with texts N and R found to be composed almost entirely of phrases shared with other tablets, though not in the same order.

(Elsewhere in these texts, animal figures are reduced to a distinctive feature such as a head or arm when they fuse with a preceding glyph.) Three of the four human and turtle figures at left have arm ligatures with an orb (glyph  which Pozdniakov found often marks a phrase boundary.

Butinov and Knorozov   

Now, if the repeated independent glyph  is a title, such as "king", and if the repeated attached glyph  is a patronymic marker, then this means something like:

King A, B's son, King B, C's son, King C, D's son, King D, E's son,

and the sequence is a lineage.

Although no-one has been able to confirm Butinov and Knorozov's hypothesis, it is widely considered plausible. If it is correct, then, first, we can identify other glyph sequences which constitute personal names. Second, the Santiago Staff would consist mostly of persons' names as it bears 564 occurrences of glyph 76, the putative patronymic marker, one fourth of the total of 2320 glyphs. Third, the sequence 606.76 700, translated by Fischer (below) as "all the birds copulated with the fish", would in reality mean (So-and-so) son of 606 was killed. The Santiago Staff, with 63 occurrences of glyph  a rebus for îka "victim", would then be in part a kohau îka (list of war casualties).

Barthel 

German ethnologist Thomas Barthel, who first published the rongorongo corpus, identified three lines on the recto (side a) of tablet C, also known as Mamari, as a lunar calendar. Guy proposed that it was more precisely an astronomical rule for whether one or two intercalary nights should be inserted into the 28-night Rapanui month to keep it in sync with the phases of the moon, and if one night, whether this should come before or after the full moon. Berthin and Berthin propose that it is the text which follows the identified calendar that shows where the intercalary nights should appear. 

{|
|
|-
|Heralding sequences: Two instances of the "heralding sequence" from line Ca7, one from before and one from after the full moon. The fish at the end of the latter is inverted, and (in the sequence immediately following the full moon only) the long-necked bird is reversed.
|}

Fischer 
In 1995 independent linguist Steven Fischer, who also claims to have deciphered the enigmatic Phaistos Disc, announced that he had cracked the rongorongo "code", making him the only person in history to have deciphered two such scripts. In the decade since, this has not been accepted by other researchers, who feel that Fischer overstated the single pattern which formed the basis of his decipherment, and note that it has not led to an understanding of other patterns.

Decipherment 

Fischer identified glyph 76 as a phallus and the text of the Santiago Staff as a creation chant consisting of hundreds of repetitions of X–phallus Y Z, which he interpreted as X copulated with Y, there issued forth Z. His primary example was this one:

about half-way through line 12 of the Santiago Staff. Fischer interpreted glyph 606 as "bird"+"hand", with the phallus attached as usual at its lower right; glyph 700 as "fish"; and glyph 8 as "sun".

Fischer supported his interpretation by claiming similarities to the recitation Atua Matariri, so called from its first words, which was collected by William Thomson. This recitation is a litany where each verse has the form X, ki ꞌai ki roto ki Y, ka pû te Z, literally "X having been inside Y the Z comes forward". Here is the first verse, according to Salmon and then according to Métraux (neither of whom wrote glottal stops or long vowels):

Fischer proposed that the glyph sequence 606.76 700 8, literally MANU:MAꞋU.ꞋAI ÎKA RAꞋÂ "bird:hand.penis fish sun", had the analogous phonetic reading of:

He claimed similar phallic triplets for several other texts. However, in the majority of texts glyph 76 is not common, and Fischer proposed that these were a later, more developed stage of the script, where the creation chants had been abbreviated to X Y Z and omit the phallus. He concluded that 85% of the rongorongo corpus consisted of such creation chants, and that it was only a matter of time before rongorongo would be fully deciphered.

Objections 
There are a number of objections to Fischer's approach:

 When Andrew Robinson checked the claimed pattern, he found that "Close inspection of the Santiago Staff reveals that only 63 out of the 113 [sic] sequences on the staff fully obey the triad structure (and 63 is the maximum figure, giving every Fischer attribution the benefit of the doubt)." Glyph  occurs sometimes in isolation, sometimes compounded with itself, and sometimes in the 'wrong' part (or even all parts) of the triplets. Other than on the Staff, Pozdniakov could find Fischer's triplets only in the poorly preserved text of Ta and in the single line of Gv which Butinov and Knorozov suggested might be a genealogy.
 Pozdniakov and Pozdniakov calculated that altogether the four glyphs of Fischer's primary example make up 20% of the corpus. "Hence it is easy to find examples in which, on the contrary, 'the sun copulates with the fish', and sometimes also with the birds. Fischer does not mention the resulting chaos in which everything is copulating in all manner of unlikely combinations. Furthermore, it is by no means obvious in what sense this 'breakthrough' is 'phonetic'."
 The plural marker mau does not exist in Rapanui, but is instead an element of Tahitian grammar. However, even if it did occur in Rapanui, Polynesian mau is only a plural marker when it precedes a noun; after a noun it is an adjective which means "true, genuine, proper".
 No Polynesian myth tells of birds copulating with fish to produce the sun. Fischer justifies his interpretation thus: This is very close to [verse] number 25 from Daniel Ure Vaꞌe Iko's procreation chant [Atua Matariri] "Land copulated with the fish Ruhi Paralyzer: There issued forth the sun." However, this claim depends on Salmon's English translation, which does not follow from his Rapanui transcription of

Heima; Ki ai Kiroto Kairui Kairui-Hakamarui Kapu te Raa.

Métraux gives the following interpretation of that verse:

He Hina [He ima?] ki ai ki roto kia Rui-haka-ma-rui, ka pu te raa.
"Moon (?) by copulating with Darkness (?) produced Sun",

which mentions neither birds nor fish.
 Given Fischer's reading, Butinov and Knorozov's putative genealogy on tablet Gv becomes semantically odd, with several animate beings copulating with the same human figure to produce themselves:

 [turtle] copulated with  [man], there issued forth  [turtle]
  [shark?] copulated with  [man] there issued forth  [shark]
 etc.
 Cryptologist Tomi Melka deduced that Fischer's hypothesis cannot be true for the entire Staff, let alone other texts.
 Computational linguist Richard Sproat could not replicate the parallels Fischer claimed between the Santiago Staff and the other texts. He automated the search for string matches between the texts and found that the staff stood alone:

Pozdniakov 
In the 1950s, Butinov and Knorozov had performed a statistical analysis of several rongorongo texts and had concluded that either the language of the texts was not Polynesian, or that it was written in a condensed telegraphic style, because it contained no glyphs comparable in frequency to Polynesian grammatical particles such as the Rapanui articles te and he or the preposition ki. These findings have since been used to argue that rongorongo is not a writing system at all, but mnemonic proto-writing. However, Butinov and Knorozov had used Barthel's preliminary encoding, which Konstantin Pozdniakov, senior researcher at the Museum of Anthropology and Ethnography of the Russian Academy of Sciences in Saint Petersburg (until 1996), noted was inappropriate for statistical analysis. The problem, as Butinov and Knorozov, and Barthel himself, had admitted, was that in many cases distinct numerical codes had been assigned to ligatures and allographs, as if these were independent glyphs. The result was that while Barthel's numerical transcription of a text enabled a basic discussion of its contents for the first time, it failed to capture its linguistic structure and actually interfered with inter-text comparison.

In 2011, Pozdniakov released a pre-press publication analyzing Text E Keiti, including a glyph-by-glyph comparison of the transcription in Barthel (1958), with misidentified glyphs corrected per Horley (2010).

Revising the glyph inventory 
To resolve this deficiency, Pozdniakov (1996) reanalyzed thirteen of the better preserved texts, attempting to identify all ligatures and allographs in order to better approach a one-to-one correspondence between graphemes and their numeric representation. He observed that all these texts but I and G verso consist predominantly of shared phrases (sequences of glyphs), which occur in different orders and contexts on different tablets. 

Phrasing: Variants of this twenty-glyph phrase, all missing some of these glyphs or adding others, are found twelve times, in eight of the thirteen texts Pozdniakov tabulated: lines Ab4, Cr2–3, Cv2, Cv12, Ev3, Ev6, Gr2–3, Hv12, Kr3, Ra6, Rb6, and Sa1. Among other things, such phrases have established or confirmed the reading order of some of the tablets.

These shared sequences begin and end with a notably restricted set of glyphs. 

Contrasting these phrases allowed Pozdniakov to determine that some glyphs occur in apparent free variation both in isolation and as components of ligatures.

Allographs: The 'hand' allographs (left), plus some of the fifty pairs of allographic 'hand' ligatures to which Barthel had assigned distinct character codes.

The fact the two hands appear to substitute for each other in all these pairs of glyphs when the repeated phrases are compared lends credence to their identity. Similarly, Pozdniakov proposed that the heads with "gaping mouths", as in glyph  are variants of the bird heads, so that the entirety of Barthel's 300 and 400 series of glyphs are seen as either ligatures or variants of the 600 series.

Despite finding that some of the forms Barthel had assumed were allographs appeared instead to be independent glyphs, such as the two orientations of his glyph 27,  the overall conflation of allographs and ligatures greatly reduced the size of Barthel's published 600-glyph inventory.  By recoding the texts with these findings and then recomparing them, Pozdniakov was able to detect twice as many shared phrases, which enabled him to further consolidate the inventory of glyphs. By 2007, he and his father, a pioneer in Russian computer science, had concluded that 52 glyphs accounted for 99.7% of the corpus. 

{| class=wikitable 
|+ 
|- align=center
|  ||  ||  ||  ||  ||  ||  ||  ||  ||  ||  ||  ||  
|- align=center
! 01 || 02 || 03 || 04 || 05 || 06 || 07 || 08 || 09 || 10 || 14 || 15 || 16 
|- align=center
|  ||  ||  ||  ||  ||  ||  ||  ||  ||  ||  ||  ||  
|- align=center
! 22 || 25 || 27a || 28 || 34 || 38 || 41 || 44 || 46 || 47 || 50 || 52 || 53
|- align=center
|  ||  ||  ||  ||  ||  ||  ||  ||  ||  ||  ||  || 
|- align=center
! 59 || 60 || 61 || 62 || 63 || 66 || 67 || 69 || 70 || 71 || 74 || 76 ||  91
|- align=center
|  ||  ||  ||  ||  ||  ||  ||  ||  ||  ||  ||  ||  
|- align=center
! 95 || 99 || 200 || 240 || 280 || 380 || 400 || 530 || 660 || 700 || 720 || 730 || 901 
|- bgcolor=white
| colspan=13| Glyph  was first proposed by Pozdniakov. The inverted variant 27b in Barthel's glyph 27 appears to be a distinct glyph.
|}

The shared repetitive nature of the phrasing of the texts, apart from Gv and I, suggests to Pozdniakov that they are not integral texts, and cannot contain the varied contents which would be expected for history or mythology. In the following table of characters in the Pozdniakov & Pozdniakov inventory, ordered by descending frequency, the first two rows of 26 characters account for 86% of the entire corpus.

{| style="text-align: center"
|-
|  ||  ||  ||  ||  ||  ||  || ||  ||  ||  ||  || 
|-
|  ||  ||  ||  ||  ||  ||  ||  ||  ||  ||  ||  || 
|-
|  ||  ||  ||  ||  ||  ||  ||  ||  ||  ||  ||  || 
|-
|  ||  ||  ||  ||  ||  ||  ||  ||  ||  ||  ||  || 
|}

Notes

References

Bibliography

External links 
 The Rongorongo of Easter Island. Provides primary sources: Eyraud, Pinart, William Thomson, George Cooke, Routledge; old decipherments; Barthel's encodings, line by line; all of Barthel's numbered glyphs; and an English translation of Englert's dictionary
 Stéphen Chauvet (1935) Easter Island and its Mysteries, with early photos of many of the tablets, as well as the Jaussen list (p. 1, p. 2, p. 3, p. 4). The section on rongorongo is here.
 Discussion by Steven Fischer, with critique by Jacques Guy
 Richard Sproat's site, with a concordance of matched sequences
 Konstantin Pozdniakov's site, with publications
 Rongorongo on Spanish Wikipedia, covering several additional attempts at decipherment.